Margaret of Pomerania can refer to:
 Margaret Sambiria (1230–1282), Queen of Denmark by marriage to King Christopher I
 Margaret of Pomerania (died 1407/1410), wife of Ernest, Duke of Austria
 Margaret of Pomerania (1518–1569), wife of Ernest III, Duke of Brunswick-Grubenhagen